Maximiliano Poblete (January 7, 1873 – July 12, 1946) was a Chilean politician and physician.

1873 births
Chilean physicians
University of Chile alumni
1946 deaths